This is a list of seaports around the coast of the island of Ireland.

List by coast

East coast
 Rosslare
 Arklow
 Wicklow
 Dún Laoghaire
 Dublin
 Howth
 Drogheda
 Dundalk
 Greenore
 Warrenpoint
 Belfast
 Larne

North coast
 Coleraine
 Derry
 Rathmullan

West coast
 Bantry Bay
 Dingle
 Fenit
 Foynes
 Galway
 Killybegs
 Rossaveal
 Kilronan
 Kilrush
 Limerick
 Shannon Foynes Port
 Sligo

South coast
 Castletown Berehaven
 Kinsale
 Cobh
 Ringaskiddy
 Tivoli
 Cork
 Youghal
 Dungarvan
 Waterford
 New Ross
 Dunmore East
 Valentia

See also
 Coastal landforms of Ireland

Ireland

Ports
Ports